The following lists events that have happened or will happen during 2016 in Uruguay.

Incumbents 
 President: Tabare Vasquez
 Vice President: Raúl Fernando Sendic

Events

April
 April 15 – 2016 Uruguay tornado, an F3 tornado strikes the southwestern Uruguayan city of Dolores, killing five.

November
 November 7 – The Partido de la Gente is founded.

References

 
2010s in Uruguay
Uruguay
Uruguay
Years of the 21st century in Uruguay